Guest House is a 2020 American comedy film co-written and directed by Sam Macaroni. The film stars Pauly Shore, Mike Castle, Aimee Teegarden, Billy Zane, Steve-O, Charlotte McKinney and Mikaela Hoover. The film released on digital and on-demand platforms on September 4, 2020.

Plot 
Three years after getting in trouble for drug use in College, Blake Renner and his girlfriend, Sarah Masters, move into a house with an excellent backyard and a guest house; however, the realtor reveals that there is one catch: a drug-addict-turned-squatter named Randy Cockfield who is living in the guest house collecting drugs and priceless artifacts. Blake works at a Skateboard shop run by Shred, while Sarah works as a school teacher. After two months, Randy is still there.  He finds a wild possum and captures it. Blake and Randy talk to each other and smoke Cannabis. Sarah is annoyed by the issues and her father, Douglas Masters, does not approve of her relationship with Blake. Blake proposes to Sarah and she accepts, despite her fathers disapproval.

Six months later, Randy is still there and Blake and Sarah are fed up. Randy organizes an orgy, and when Blake tries to stop them he is drugged and destroys a gazebo shooting fireworks into the sky. Following the incident, Blake is arrested by corrupt cops, who are friends of Randy. A turf war starts between Randy and Blake. Blake assaults Randy and is arrested and bailed out again. The corrupt cops allow Randy to get a restraining order from Blake. Randy sneaks into the couple's house and injects MDMA in their water bottles, altering their behavior and resulting in uncontrolled sexual activity which results in Blake getting fired. With more time on his hands, Blake hires a crew to bug-bomb the guest house, causing Randy to have to escape for medical reasons. With Randy gone, Blake and Sarah organize a quiet dinner in the backyard. Randy returns and releases a drug-addicted possum with rabies on them, and the group are bitten by the possum, leading to the need of rabies injections. One member ends up in the emergency room due to the severity of the bites.

Blake and Sarah organize their wedding in the backyard and, despite her father's objections, the wedding proceeds and the couple is married. Randy puts MDMA in their drinks, causing the wedding guests to behave abnormally and cause home damages. Blake finds Randy hidden in the attic and attempts to beat him to death until Douglas stops him and beats him. Randy and Blake are arrested and Sarah bails Blake out. Sarah also reveals that she's pregnant with Blake's son.

Blake finds a new job and the two are separated until they are asked to return for questioning about the house. They find Randy and make peace, officially ending their turf war.  He explains that he repaired the home damages with money made from selling a priceless artifact from his collection which was worth millions. Randy explains that the house was originally owned by his parents and he had been preventing it from being sold because of his childhood memories. Randy shows that he has redesigned the guest house into a room for their baby and that he wants a family to live in the house.
Randy leaves, and the two newly-weds move in and start to raise their son in the house. They eventually get a video chat from Randy who is now partying on a Yacht. He claims that he and his companions will be coming to the guest house. Blake and Sarah say that they won't allow him to squat in the guest house again.

Cast

Production
In May 2019, Macaroni wrapped principal photography on the film.

Reception
ITunes Gives It A 3.2/5 based on 1 review

References

External links
 
 

2020 films
American comedy films
Lionsgate films
2020 comedy films
2020s English-language films
2020s American films
2020 directorial debut films